Karel Boom, also known as Charles Boom (3 April 1858, Hoogstraten - 13 February 1939, Antwerp) was a Belgian genre painter, watercolorist and art teacher.

Life and work
He attended the Royal Academy of Fine Arts (Antwerp), where he studied with Edward Dujardin, Lucas Victor Schaefels and Charles Verlat.

After completing his studies, he worked as a freelance genre and portrait painter in Antwerp, and assisted Verlat with his battle paintings of the Coalition Wars, in Waterloo and Russia. He also performed decorative work at the Town Halls in Antwerp and Hoogstraten.

From 1885 to 1924, he held the post of Professor at the Royal Academy.

He was a recipient of the Knight's Cross in the Order of Leopold.

Sources 
 Heinrich Hammer: "Boom, Karel". In: Ulrich Thieme, Felix Becker (Eds.): Allgemeines Lexikon der Bildenden Künstler von der Antike bis zur Gegenwart. Vol.4: Bida–Brevoort. Wilhelm Engelmann, Leipzig 1910, pg. 331 (Online)
 Boom, Charles in: Dictionnaire des peintres belges (Digitalisat)

External links 
 
 More works by Boom @ ArtNet

1858 births
1939 deaths
Belgian painters
Belgian genre painters
Belgian portrait painters
Royal Academy of Fine Arts (Antwerp) alumni
Academic staff of the Royal Academy of Fine Arts (Antwerp)
People from Hoogstraten